Dr. Horrible's Sing-Along Blog is the soundtrack to the 2008 web series of the same name.
with lyrics and liner notes appearing on the series' website the next day. On the first full day of its release, it was the most downloaded album on iTunes in both Canada and Australia, and reached No. 2 in the U.S.
On September 10, 2008, Dr. Horrible's Sing-Along Blog debuted at No. 39 on the Billboard 200 despite being an iTunes exclusive.

The soundtrack was released on CD on December 15, 2008, exclusive to Amazon US.

Track listing

Personnel
 Danny Chaimson - Piano (11)
 Nick Gusikoff - Guitar (6)
 Stacy Shirk - Backing Vocals (11)
 Maurissa Tancharoen - Backing Vocals (11, 13)
 Amir Yaghmai - Violin (14)
 Jed Whedon - All other instruments, Producer
 Robert Hadley - Mastering

References

External links
Dr. Horrible's Sing-Along Blog official site
Lyrics and liner notes

2008 soundtrack albums
Television soundtracks